The Fiat 500 is an A-segment city car manufactured and marketed by the Fiat subdivision of Stellantis since 2007. It is available in hatchback coupé and fixed-profile convertible body styles, over a single generation — with an intermediate facelift in Europe with model year 2016. The 500 is internally designated as the Type 312 by FCA.

Derived from the 2004 Fiat Trepiùno 3+1 concept (designed by Roberto Giolito), the 500's styling recalls Fiat's 1957 Fiat 500, nicknamed the Bambino — a model that was designed and engineered by Dante Giacosa with more than 4 million sold over its 18-year (1957–1975) production span. In 2011, Roberto Giolito of Centro Stile Fiat received Compasso d'Oro industrial design award for Fiat 500.

Manufactured in Tychy, Poland, and Toluca, Mexico, the 500 is marketed in more than 100 countries worldwide, including North America, where the 500 marked Fiat's market return after 27 years. With the millionth Fiat 500 produced in 2012; and production reaching 2 million in 2017, after 10 years. The 2,5 millionth Fiat 500 was produced in the plant of Tychy, Poland, in March 2021. 
The 500 has won more than 40 major awards, including the CAR Magazine Car of the Year (2007) and the World's Most Beautiful Automobile.

Design and development
Since 1998, Fiat's entry-level model in Europe had been the Polish-built Seicento, itself an updated version of the 1991 Cinquecento. These models had only ever been sold with three doors, although Fiat had responded to the growing demand for five-door city cars in 2003 by launching the Panda, which replaced a three-door model of the same name which had slotted into Fiat's European range between the Cinquecento/Seicento and the larger Punto. Around the time of the Panda's launch, Fiat set about developing a three-door city car to replace the Cinquecento.

Driven by the tremendous success of the Smart Fortwo, especially in Italy, Fiat began examining a variety of small car concepts "to regain its small-car crown," — developing an "intense interest at producing a Smart (Fortwo) competitor" — and concluding that "most customers want more than just the Smart's two seats."

The 2004 Fiat Trepiùno concept, from which the 500 derives, was introduced at the 74th Geneva Motorshow — designed at Centro Stile Fiat by Roberto Giolito in a style strongly reminiscent of the original Fiat 5001957.

The name "Trepiùno" is a contraction of the Italian words "tre più uno", or "three plus one" in English; as the design accommodates three adults and one child — by reducing requirements ahead of the front passenger (with high-tech, space-saving, thin materials), sliding the front passenger forward, and positioning the third adult directly behind the passenger, allowing a fourth, smaller, occasional passenger to sit behind the driver.

The concept design was translated into the 2007 production model under the direction of Frank Stephenson. According to Stephenson, aerodynamic concerns were paramount with the new 500, saying his team preferred the look without the spoiler as on the original Nuova 500.  Nonetheless, the small rear spoiler at the top of the rear hatch provides a CD of 0.32 — where without the spoiler the drag coefficient would have been 0.40.

The 500 uses a widened variant of the Fiat Mini platform. The 500 features Dante Giacosa's 1964 breakthrough front-wheel drive layout — which ultimately became an industry standard, the layout "adopted by virtually every other manufacturer in the world" for front-wheel drive automobiles. Announced on May 5, 2006, photographs of the 500 were presented on March 20, 2007, officially debuting on July 4, 2007, with 250,000 people in attendance and with new models prominently displayed in 30 Italian cities.

The 500 uses Fiat's Multiair hydraulically actuated variable valve timing (VVT) engine technology, winner of the 2010 International Engine of the Year as well as Popular Science's Best of What's New.

Models

In addition to the distinct 500C (Cabrio), Abarth (full sport), and 500e (all-electric) models, the 500 is marketed variously around the globe with other trim levels — for example, the Sport and Turbo trim levels in the United States, and the Pop Star trim levels in Europe.

500C (2009–)

The fixed-profile convertible variant of the 500 debuted at the Geneva Motor Show in March 2009 designated the 500C (C for Cabrio), historically recalling the fixed-profile convertible of the original 1957 Fiat 500, as well as similar fixed-profile convertibles such as the Vespa 400 (1957), Citroën DS 3 (2013), Nissan Figaro (1991), Citroën 2CV (1948–1990) and the Nash Rambler Convertible "Landau" Coupe (1950).

The 500C features fully stamped body-side panels retaining the hatchback 500's profile (door frames, roof pillars and side windows) to increase structural rigidity, reduce scuttle shake, and retain side and curtain airbags, in exchange for a less open experience than a fully pillarless convertible. Weighing  more than its hatchback counterpart, the 500C features a slightly longer windshield than the hatchback, with a concealed and reinforced upper structural cross-member, a stronger front cross-member behind the instrument panel, a rear strut on which the retracted roof folds, reinforced B-pillars, and the rear anti-roll bar setup from the Abarth, high-performance model.

The top itself is a dual-layer, three-position power-retractable cloth top with a glass rear window,  electric defroster and an integrated color-matched spoiler with a center high-mounted stop lamp that remains visible with the top in any position. The top retracts in three stages: over the two front passengers, overall four passengers (to the rear spoiler), and fully retracted with its stack folded behind the rear head restraints just above the rear cargo opening.

At its rear trunk lid, the 500C features "parallelogram" liftgate hinges. When the rear cargo lid is opened while the top is fully lowered, the top automatically closes partially for greater cargo access. Because of limited rear visibility, 500C models are equipped with an ultrasonic rear park assist system to audibly indicate obstacles when backing.

Abarth 500 (2008–)

The Abarth 500 is a performance model of the Fiat 500 tuned in-house by FCA's Abarth subsidiary. It was unveiled at the 78th Geneva Motor Show, a year after the rebirth of Abarth brand and company. All models use a turbocharged and intercooled version of the 1.4 L Fire I4 petrol engine.

It includes a five-speed C510 transmission, low ride suspension, electric power steering with sport setting, 6.5 x 16" aluminium alloy rim with 195/45 R16 tyres and four-wheel disc brakes (front ventilated). Interior includes turbo pressure gauge, gear shift indicator, aluminum foot pedals, Blue&Me entertainment system with telemetry and GPS. The car costs £13,600 in the UK. A 5-speed automated manual transmission (called MTA) is available as an alternative to the manual transmission.

Later, in 2016, the facelift version was released, introducing several different variants of the 595, ranging from 140 hp to 180 hp. The lineup was composed by (in order of power): 
Basic 595
Turismo
Pista
Competizione (180 hp)
Essesse (180 hp)

Later, in 2020 new very limited edition versions were released. These being the "Scorpioneoro" edition and the "Yamaha Monster Edition". The scorpioneoro is easily distinguishable thanks to its gold details found on the paintwork as well as wheels. The interior of the scorpioneoro also has unique features such as a scorpion specific pattern on the seats as well as gold stitching. The scoprioneoro has 165 hp, just like the Turismo variant. The Yamaha Monster Edition has been made to show the collaboration and shared passion between the Moto GP team and Abarth. The Yamaha Monster Edition is distinguishable thanks to its black and blue paint-job together with its Monster energy drink logos.

The Abarth version of the 500C (cabriolet) was unveiled at the 2010 Geneva Motor Show.

Fiat 500e (2013)

A production battery electric Fiat 500e was unveiled in November 2012 at the Los Angeles Auto Show, and sales began in the US state of California in July 2013, expanding to Oregon in the summer of 2014; these sales focused on states that had political mandates for sales of zero emission vehicles. Fiat-Chrysler stated from the beginning that there were no plans to make the 500e officially available in Europe. The 500e was produced from 2013 until 2019; a second-generation electric 500 was announced in early 2020 and launched in Europe as Fiat New 500; the New 500 is not currently offered for sale in North America.

Third party conversion and concept history 
An electric conversion of the Fiat 500 was first shown at the London Motor Show in July 2008.

A concept electric 500 by Fiat/Chrysler was shown as the 500 Elettra or 500 BEV Concept at the 2010 Detroit Auto Show in January, positioned as a competitor to the Mini E, but details of the electric vehicle were not initially available. The electrified 500 appeared to be a working prototype, as it contained a traction battery and motor with a pushbutton transmission. Shortly after the 2010 show, Fiat/Chrysler announced an all-electric 500, based on the 500 Elettra Concept, would go into production starting in 2012.

The production 500e was unveiled in November 2012, at the Los Angeles Auto Show, followed by a second appearance at the 2013 Frankfurt Motor Show.

Availability 

Deliveries began in California by July 2013, and around 2,310 units were sold in the U.S. in 2013. The Fiat 500e went on sale in Oregon in the summer of 2014, and US sales are limited to just these two states.

The American rollout was scheduled to continue to other states with mandates of sales of zero emission vehicles; for Europe, Fiat-Chrysler said in 2012 there were no plans to make the 500e officially available. However, Scuderia-E has imported and sold used 500e vehicles which were originally on sale in the United States for the European market, refitted with higher-capacity batteries and a CCS combination socket for fast charging.

In September 2019, Fiat announced it was discontinuing the entire subcompact hatchback 500 line in the United States, including the 500e; existing dealer stock was expected to sustain sales into 2020.

Design 

The combination of alternating current motor, battery, and inverter has a claimed efficiency of 92%. Charging time is less than four hours when connected to a 240V AC source using the on-board 6.6kW charging module. Although the 500e does not come equipped with or offers as an option a DC fast charging connector, the development engineers state the car is equipped to handle charging at up to 480V and 70A if the appropriate connector is retrofitted to the car.

Robert Bosch GmbH supplies all the powertrain components for the 500e, including the electric motor, power electronics, and battery. The motor, which Bosch have designated the SMG ("sequential motor-generator") 180/120, is shared with other vehicles, including the smart fortwo electric and PSA GROUP's HYbrid4. The SMG 180/120 weighs just  and spins at a speed up to 12,500rpm. Chrysler developed and integrated the electric powertrain, and reportedly had been working on an electrified 500 even before the company was purchased by Fiat. Ward's named the 500e powertrain to its list of 10 Best Engines for 2014.

Designers and engineers of the Fiat 500e worked to minimize drag while keeping the iconic styling of the conventional powered Fiat 500. For the 500e to achieve a 0.311 coefficient of drag (C), as compared to the 2013 Fiat 500 Lounge model's 0.359 C, eight exterior refinements were developed in the wind tunnel to enable the 48 count drag reduction. The result of hours of wind-tunnel testing allowed the 500e to achieve an additional five miles of range compared to its gasoline-powered sibling. Among these changes are front fascia sealing, aerodynamically optimized front fascia design, drag-reducing rear fascia design, liftgate-mounted aerodynamic spoiler, and under-vehicle belly pans.

Development of the production 500e started with prototypes assembled by hand at Chrysler headquarters in Auburn Hills, Michigan; the prototypes used components from suppliers (later announced as Bosch) and were shipped to Sonoma County, California (as the initially planned market was California) for testing in the summer of 2012. The Chrysler engineering team was tasked with integrating the hardware components and tuning the finished car to behave as close to a conventionally gas-powered 500 as possible. Some of the aerodynamic refinements developed for the production 500e were intended to be back-fitted to the regular 500.

Fiat describes the 500e's unique exterior design as retro-futuristic, and the vehicle had a smartphone app that notifies the owner of the vehicle's status. Behind the steering wheel the 500e had a new 7-inch thin-film transistor (TFT) display to provide increased functionality with more intuitively delivered information of the power gauge, driving range and state of charge. In addition, a new Electronic Vehicle Information Center (EVIC) provided full-color capabilities with the use of picture graphics to illustrate vehicle functions including a trip computer, tire-pressure monitoring, and vehicle status messaging system. The available TomTom navigation pairs with the Fiat 500e's standard BLUE&ME Handsfree Communication technology and features a 4.3-inch touchscreen display mounted on top of the instrument panel.

Pricing 
The Fiat 500e pricing started at  including a  destination charge and before any applicable government incentives. The leasing pricing is the same as the current lease offer on a gasoline-powered Fiat 500 Pop. Sergio Marchionne reported that Fiat loses $14,000 on every 500e it sells, and only produces the cars because California rules require automobile manufacturers who sell a certain number of cars in the state to sell a percentage of that total as zero emissions vehicles.

In April 2013, Fiat North America announced that to avoid range anxiety concerns and allow customers to cover longer travel distances, each 500e purchase will include the use of rental vehicles for up to 12 days a year for free through the first three years of ownership. The program, called ePass, entitles 500e owners to a business account with enough points to rent a gasoline-powered standard car with Enterprise Holdings, which owns Enterprise Rent-A-Car, National Car Rental and Alamo Rent a Car. Fiat will deposit additional points the following two years to extend the program. The gasoline-powered cars available for the ePass program are the Fiat 500, the upcoming Fiat 500L, the Dodge Dart or the Chrysler 200. Customers will also have the option to upgrade to a larger vehicle such as a minivan or a pickup truck subject to terms of the program.

Some electric cars depreciate more rapidly than conventionally powered cars and trucks, according to NerdWallet if depreciation is calculated based on the pre-tax credit price. For all-electric cars depreciation varies between 60% and 75% in three years. In contrast, most conventionally powered vehicles in the same period depreciate between 45% and 50%.

Sales and production 

The entire production run of 2013 models was sold out by June 2013, before the first cars were delivered to new owners. About 16,549 units have been sold in the U.S. through May 2016. Because Fiat/Chrysler does not report sales of the 500e model independently, sales figures are estimated from state rebate data.

The first-generation 500e was assembled at the Toluca Car Assembly plant in Mexico. In the wake of the failure of its planned merger with Renault in July 2019, Fiat Chrysler Automobiles announced it was investing  million to convert its entire Mirafiori plant to production of the second-generation 500e, hoping to produce up to 80,000 electric vehicles per year, starting in the second quarter of 2020.

Recalls 
In August 2013 Chrysler issued a recall to replace bolts that secure the Fiat 500e half-drive-shafts. The recall was not related to the 500e's electric powertrain and affected 291 model year 2013 Fiat 500e cars, including vehicles at dealers' lots. When an investigation was launched after a customer's 500e exhibited power loss, engineers discovered two assembly steps that had not been properly completed, thereby creating a condition that could lead to half-shaft separation. Fiat 500e owners affected by the recall were to receive free rental vehicles while their cars were repaired at no charge.

2016 facelift

For model year 2016, the Fiat 500 and Fiat 500C received a facelift including redesigned grille and reshaped headlights incorporating daytime running lights with LED technology; revised 15" and 16" alloy wheels; new paint colors, rear bumper chrome strip with fog lights and rear taillights featured integrated LEDs. Interiors have revised controls and a redesigned steering wheel. Available trims are Pop, Pop Star, Lounge and S. Three engines are available in Europe: 1.2 petrol, 0.9 Twin Air petrol in either 85 or 105 hp setup, all Euro 6 emission compliant.

The facelifted 500 (and in some markets, the 1957 Edition) were introduced with strong product placement tie-ins with Charlie Puth's debut single, "Marvin Gaye" — in both the song's video as well as prominent print advertising.

For 2022 Fiat includes a Mild Hybrid version accompanied by a 1.0 three-cylinder engine with a combined power of 70 hp. All models now have a 7-inch screen along with Android Auto and Apple car Play, a version called RED can now be purchased, fight against AIDS and COVID-19 all proceeds will be donated to Global Flund.

Pre-facelift styling

Post-facelift styling

Specifications

Engines
FCA launched the 500 with three Euro5-compliant engines: two petrol/gasoline and one diesel engine. The 1.3 Multijet was equipped with a diesel particulate filter (DPF). Despite the 500's name, which originally corresponded to its engine displacement, the lowest displacement is 1242 cc with 69 metric horsepower (PS), notably larger and more powerful than both the original 5001957–1975 and the Cinquecento1991–1998.

A smaller, turbocharged two-cylinder Twinair engine with 85 PS was later unveiled at the 2010 Geneva Motor Show, entering production the following year. 
The TwinAir received the Best New Engine Award for 2011 and was marketed the "world's greenest petrol engine," based on official Euro test cycle data for emissions and fuel consumption.

This engine delivers . Availability is limited to selected markets, e.g., the Netherlands.

The 105PS 0.9 TwinAir engine model was unveiled at the 2013 Frankfurt Motor Show.

Fuel consumption (EC 1999/100)

Fuel consumption (EPA)

Safety
The new 500 has seven airbags in all models and available ABS brakes, ESP (electronic stability program), ASR (antislip regulation), HBA (hydraulic brake assistance) and hill holder. 

Rear disc brakes are optional.

The car was named "Worst Car For Passenger Injuries" in a study by a US-based insurance group analysed rates for Personal Injury Protection (PIP) and Medical Payments (MedPay) policies, which cover payouts to injured passengers.

Euro NCAP
The 500 was awarded five stars by EuroNCAP, succeeding the BMW MINI as the shortest car to have a five-star rating. Fiat also said that the 500 was engineered so that it would have achieved a six-star rating had EuroNCAP adopted this classification.

The Fiat 500 passed the Euro NCAP car safety tests in 2008 with the following ratings:

In 2017, it scored 3 stars:

IIHS

The Fiat 500 also scored "Poor" in small overlap crash testing by the IIHS 
The 2012 and 2013 models earned the Top Safety Pick award.

1 vehicle structure rated "Poor"
2 strength-to-weight ratio: 6.16

NHTSA 

The side impact safety of the 500 has improved in newer models :
Click <> to sort by other parameters.

Security
The Fiat 500 has remote locking and an immobiliser as standard. The Fiat 500 was tested by Thatcham's New Vehicle Security Ratings (NVSR) organisation and achieved the following ratings:

Special editions

500 Start&Stop 
The 500 Start&Stop is a model based on the 1.2 Lounge, with the start-stop system, designed and supplied by Bosch and Fiat Powertrain Technologies, stops the engine automatically whenever traffic conditions bring the car to a complete stop and restart it when the driver wants to move off again. The car reduces fuel consumption by up to 12% over a regular 1.2 Lounge in urban driving, with 113g/km  emission. Other standard features include hands-free telecommunications and entertainment systems. It costs  in the UK.

500 PUR-O2 (2008–) 
The 500 PUR-O2 is based on the Fiat 500 Start&Stop, but also includes an Eco-Drive system. Beginning in January 2009, a Dualogic transmission option is also available. The vehicle was unveiled in the 2008 Paris Motor Show.

500 by Diesel (2008–2009) 

In 2008, Fiat launched a special edition 'By Diesel' 500. In a partnership with Fiat and Italian clothing brand Diesel, with a production run of 10,000 planned. The 500 by Diesel is available in a choice of three exclusive colours, and can be distinguished from standard 500s by unique alloy wheels, 'Diesel' logos and burnished metal bumper and side-rub inserts. The interior features denim upholstery with coloured stitching and a 'Diesel' branded gear knob. The 500 by Diesel is based on the 500 Sport, using the same 1.2 L petrol, 1.4 L petrol and 1.3 L diesel engines.

500 Aria (2008) 
The 500 Aria is a concept car based on the 1.3 L Diesel vehicle, but with diesel particulate filter, Stop & Start system, Dualogic transmission, recycled rubber floor from used tires, recycled and woven leather upholstery (mataleather) by Matamata, Ecolabel polyester fabrics by Apollo company. The vehicle was unveiled in the 2008 Geneva Motor Show.

Ferrari edition (2008) 
The Fiat 500 Ferrari edition is a limited edition model (200 units) of the 1.4 (100 bhp) Sport, mainly used by Ferrari dealers as courtesy cars for owners to use while their Ferraris are being serviced. It includes a red body color, aluminum pedals, red brake calipers, 16-inch wheels with 195/45 tires, sporty steering wheel and a few tuning and exhaust modifications. Sixty of the Ferrari edition cars were shipped to the UK.

Felipe Massa version (2008) 
The Felipe Massa version is a customized 1.4 Sport presented to Formula 1 driver Felipe Massa. The vehicle was unveiled in Monte Carlo (Monaco).

Barbie version (2009) 

A special edition of the 500 designed to commemorate the 50th anniversary of the toy icon Barbie. Created by Centro Stile Fiat and Mattel, the car was unveiled on March 9, 2009, in Milan's fashion district, and parked at the entrance to La Rinascente department store, in Piazza Duomo, where German singer Nena performed live in the background. The 500 Barbie Edition will also be making an appearance at Fiat UK's flagship store at Marylebone in London.

Pink (2010) 

A limited edition 500, featured in pink, based on the 1.2 Lounge.

BlackJack (2010) 
A limited-edition 500 in a special Satin Black paint. It is the first vehicle in the small car segment to feature this unique paint finish.
Other special features include:
 Mouldings, door handles, door mirrors and plate holder in metallic effect
 16-inch alloy wheels in matte black with red coach line
 Red brake calipers (1.4 only)
 Special carpet mats

500 by Gucci (2011–) 

The Fiat 500 by Gucci was a version of the Fiat 500 celebrating 150 years since the unification of Italy and Gucci's 90th anniversary. Customized by Gucci Creative Director Frida Giannini in partnership with Fiat's Centro Stile, it included a choice of 2 body colours (black or white), custom wheels for 195/45 R16 tires, and a red and green stripe around the car. The black version has detailing in metallic chrome with a sharp black and white interior for a contemporary and sporty feel, whilst the white version has satin chrome detailing with an ivory and black interior creating a softer look. Versions with the 1.4-litre engine include rear brake calipers in Gucci green. There is also a cabriolet version of the Gucci, called 500C by Gucci. It included a choice of two body colours (white with matte chrome-plated elements or gloss black with shiny chrome-plated accents), a black soft top with green-red-green Gucci web pattern printed lengthwise (the same graphic pattern is sported on the side of the car), 16-inch alloy wheels, and two-tone Frau leather seats with Guccissima print.

The hatchback version was unveiled in metropolitan cities such as Paris, London, and Tokyo, followed by a European commercial launch in July. The production order was available between April 1 and June 30 in Europe, and become available in the rest of the world at the end of 2011. In 2011, the car made its U.S. debut at the New York Fashion Week.

The convertible version began to be available to order in August 2011. As part of the product launch, beginning on 19 August, 500C by Gucci car took a tour in Saint Tropez (from 19 to 27 August) followed by Berlin (8–14 September), Barcelona (25 September – 2 October), London (16–23 October) and Geneva (23–30 October). In Italy, the tour started from Forte Dei Marmi (22–28 August) and then reach Rome (4–11 September), Florence (19–26 September) and Milan (8–16 October).

500 "America" (2012) 
A total of 500 coupés and 500 convertible versions were available in the European market that was inspired by the United States where Fiat 500 sales began in 2011, and where Fiat's collaboration with the American pop singer Jennifer Lopez started. The "America" model includes mirror covers with "Stars & Stripes" graphics, stickers, dedicated beltline, and 16" alloy rims with red cap edge, an interior of red/ivory seats, and contrasting white dashboard, manual air conditioning, and exterior chrome-plated trim. The coupe model also includes metallic shade America Blue body.

The first car was won by Adelheid D. Kieper from Rosche, Germany, in a TwitBid campaign.

Fiat 500 Vintage 57/1957 Retro edition (2015) 

The special edition, marketed variously as the Vintage 57 (Europe) or as the 1957 Edition (North America), features exterior paint in Bianco (white), Verde Chiaro (light green) or Celeste Blue (pastel sky blue) combined with a white roof and mirror caps; brown leather upholstery and color-matched (in the US, white elsewhere) 16-inch forged aluminum wheels, retro-styled with a wide chromed lip, body-color accent and large center caps with historic "FIAT" emblem — the design mimicking chrome hubcaps. The Vintage '57 500c features a dual-layer power-operated cloth top. The front hood and rear tailgate also feature the historic "FIAT" emblems, as well.

Fiat 500 Ron Arad Edition 
This version of the Fiat 500 features a silhouette of the historic Nuova 500 on its side panels. The interior includes black-ivory Poltrona Frau leather upholstery. It is available only in Crossover Black Metallic with white trim.

500 Riva (2017) 

This is a special edition of the facelift Fiat 500 that showcases the Riva yacht brand, which is owned by the Ferretti Group. It features special Sera Blue paint with a contrasting double aquamarine line running around the waist of the car. The interior continues the luxury yacht theme, with ivory leather seats complemented by mahogany wood trim running across the dashboard. The Riva special edition is available in both hatchback and 500C convertible variants.

500 Dolcevita (2019) 
The new Fiat 500 Dolcevita special edition sports a Gelato White livery, enhanced by a red, white and red beauty line drawn around the entire silhouette. The convertible version for the first time in the history of the model, it is fitted with a horizontal white-and-blue striped top with embroidered red "500" logo inspired by the deck chairs and beach umbrellas of the Italian Riviera of the Sixties. The engine range includes the 69-hp 1.2-litre engine paired with the Dualogic automatic or manual transmission, the 85-hp 0.9-litre Twin Air and the 69-hp 1.2 LPG, the latter two both with a manual transmission.

Abarth special editions

Abarth 500 Opening Edition 
The 500 Abarth "Opening Edition" is a limited production model (100 cars) for the Italian market. It includes the upgrades found in the 500 Abarth Esseesse. The car is available in two colours (Campovolo grey or pearlised White), while there is also the option of special stickers including a red chequered flag on the roof (exclusive to the Campovolo Grey shade) that pays homage to the numerous sporting victories of the Abarth brand.

Abarth 500 Assetto Corse 
Unveiled in the 2008 Paris Motor Show, the 500 Abarth Assetto Corse is a limited production model (49 cars), designed by the Fiat Group Automobiles Style Centre and produced by a team of Abarth Engineers and Designers. It includes white  special ultralight racing wheels, low ride, sports racing mirrors and a place for a number on the sides and a pastel grey body color with red Abarth side stripes.

Abarth 695 "Tributo Ferrari" (2009) 

The Abarth 695 "Tributo Ferrari" is a limited edition version developed in collaboration with engineers from Ferrari based on Abarth 500. The  Turbo T-Jet 16v engine is further developed and uses a different Garrett turbocharger. It includes an "MTA" (automated manual transmission), an electrohydraulic-actuated transmission with paddle shifters, unique to this version, 17 inch alloy wheels with performance tyres, Brembo  multi-section discs with fixed 4-piston calipers, "Record Monza" variable back-pressure "dual mode" exhaust, Scuderia Red body with Racing Grey wheels and rear air intakes, Magneti Marelli Automotive Lighting xenon headlights, "Abarth Corsa by Sabelt" seats in black leather upholstery with carbon fibre shell and seat base, black leather steering wheel with red leather inserts and a tricolour hub, Jaeger instrument panel, non-slip aluminium foot wells, Scorpion racing pedals, special kick plates and a plate bearing the vehicle series number. This version will eventually be released also in blue, yellow and grey. The vehicle was unveiled in the 2009 Frankfurt Motor Show.

Abarth 500 SpeedGrey (2009) 
The Abarth 500 "SpeedGrey" is a very limited edition version model (10 cars only) produced by Neubauer, the official Abarth distributor in France, exclusively for the French market. Starting from the "Esseesse" version of the Abarth 500, Neubauer added the "Record Monza" variable back-pressure "dual mode" exhaust system (boosting output to ), as well as a pair of "Abarth Corsa by Sabelt" seats in black leather upholstery with carbon-fibre shell and seat base. Tinted windows were added, along with the Blue&Me GPS system. Finally, Neubauer repainted the car in a special "Maserati Grey" paint.

Abarth 500 "Cabrio Italia" (2011) 
The Abarth 500 "Cabrio Italia" is a limited (150 units) model commemorating the 150th anniversary of Italian unity, unveiled at the 64th Frankfurt International Motor Show in 2011. It includes the 1.4 Turbo T-Jet engine from the Abarth Esseesse, 5-speed manual gearbox, Torque Transfer Control device, Esseesse brake system, Abarth Corsa by Sabelt natural leather seats, Blu Abu Dhabi shade dashboard, Abarth Blue&Me MAP satellite navigation unit with a telemetric function developed by Magneti Marelli, black leather with a double-stitching steering wheel, magnesium shade mirror covers, 10-spoke 17" rims with diamond effect and yellow Brembo front calipers.

Abarth 695 Competizione (2011) 
The Abarth 695 "Competizione" is inspired by the Abarth 500 Assetto Corsa, which debuted at the 2011 Frankfurt International Motor Show together with the Cabrio Italia. It includes only 2 seats with a rear roll bar, Grigio Competizione Opaco paint, Abarth Corsa by Sabelt seats in black leather with red Alcantara leather inserts with carbon fiber shell and seat base, black leather steering wheel, 5-speed "Abarth Competizione" gearshift paddles, instrument panel made by Jaeger, Abarth Blue&Me MAP satellite navigation unit with a telemetric function developed by Magneti Marelli, Abarth logo racing pedals, Xenon headlights with dipped and main beam functions, 17-inch rims from Abarth 695 Tributo Ferrari, red Brembo brake calipers and center cap, 1.4 Turbo T-Jet engine rated , Abarth Competizione electromechanical transmission, Brembo 305 mm disc brakes with fixed four-piston caliper disc and special shock absorbers and Record Monza variable back-pressure "dual mode" exhaust.

Abarth 595 

In 2012 the Abarth range was enlarged with the addition of the  Abarth 595. Four versions are available, both with either manual or MTA transmission and in hatchback or cabriolet body style: Custom, Turismo, Competizione, Kit Elaborazione.

The Abarth 595 Custom is the launch version with 135 hp.
The Abarth 595 Turismo features standard leather upholstery, upgraded dampers, and climate control, Xenon headlights, and Alutex interior details. The sportier Abarth 595 Competizione replaces leather seats with Sabelt cloth sport seats and Alutex with aluminum while adding cross-drilled brakes and the Record Monza dual-mode exhaust.
The Kit Abarth Elaborazione 595 is a powerful kit for the Custom version, with 160 hp engine, BMC Air sport filter, Koni FSD suspensions, Brembo HP1000/1 forward pads, Eibach low springs and new badge 595.

Abarth 695 Tributo Maserati (2012) 

The vehicle was unveiled at the 2012 Geneva Motor Show.

Abarth 595 '50th Anniversary' (2013–) 
It is a limited (299 vehicles) version of the Abarth 595 commemorating the 50th anniversary of the original Fiat-Abarth 595, with  1.4 T-Jet engine, Abarth Competizione gearbox, 17-inch alloy wheels with 695 Magnesio Grey design embellished and red liner, Brembo 305 mm floating brake discs, fixed four-piston caliper, special shock absorbers, 'Record Monza' variable back-pressure dual-mode exhaust, matt three-layer white body color, Xenon headlights with dipped and driving light functions, red leather sports seats with white inserts and red stitching, Abarth logo at the black leather steering wheel with red inserts and finder and the kick plate.

The vehicle was unveiled at the 2013 Frankfurt Motor Show.

Abarth 500 esseesse 

The kit also includes cross-drilled and ventilated  x  front brake discs with new pads,  x  cross-drilled rear brake discs, lowered springs, sport air filter, 17-inch white or titanium colour alloy wheels with 205/40 R17 tyres, tyre pressure monitoring system, and a unique key cover. The conversion costs  in the UK.

Abarth 695 70° Anniversario (2019–) 
The Abarth 695 70° Anniversario was unveiled at the 2019 Abarth Days in Milan, as part of the brand's 70th-anniversary celebrations. Limited to 1949 units, it is powered by the  1.4 Turbo T-Jet engine. Highlights of the special edition include an adjustable rear spoiler.

500 Edicion Especial Tributo a Mexico (2019) 
Abarth has recently launched a special edition of the 500 for the Mexican market to end its production in Toluca. It has a 17" Pirelli PZero Nero aluminium alloy wheels, disc brakes in all wheels and security assistance such as ABS, traction and stability control, and 7 airbags. It is limited to 37 units.

International markets

Mexico (North America)
The new 500 was introduced in Mexico in September 2008, powered the 1.4 L 16V  engine, transmissions are Dualogic for the '500 Classic', '500 Lounge' and '500 Vintage' trims or six-speed manual gearbox for the '500 Sport' Trim. The 'Abarth 500', 'Abarth 500 esseesse', 'Abarth 500C', and the 'Abarth 695 Tributo Ferrari' variants have been sold through independent importers. Mexico became the first country in the Americas in which the new 500 is sold. As of 2011, the Fiat 500 is also manufactured in Mexico. In 2012 when the North American 500 released all Mexican 500's got an update to meet the North American Spec. As of Sept. 2019, the Nuova 500 has ended production for the North American market.

Canada and U.S.
The Fiat 500 debuted at the 2010 North American International Auto Show with production beginning in December 2010 — effectively reintroducing the Fiat brand in the United States and Canada after 26 years.

The North American 500 is marketed in Pop, Lounge, Sport and Turbo trim levels with market-specific modifications including increased body strength; revised suspension; changes for reduced noise, vibration, and harshness; BiHalogen projector headlamps and amber front and red rear sidemarker lights and reflectors on each wheel arch edge to comply with FMVSS 108; new four-wheel anti-lock disc brake system with new front calipers; larger  fuel tank; upgraded heating and cooling system; revised front seats with an armrest and seat cushion; easy entry system designed into the driver's seats; revised steering wheel controls and revised steering; a Bose branded audio system as well as a more rounded center grille and a plastic lip that wraps onto the bottom of the spoiler. FCA offers the North American 500 with either an AISIN 6-speed automatic transmission with a driver-selectable mode as well as a 5-speed manual.

Fiat began marketing the 500C in Spring 2011. The 500 Abarth is also confirmed for North American markets.

The North American 500 has the 1.4-litre 16v MultiAir FIRE engine from the Fiat Panda 100HP, and the European-market Fiat 500 1.4 16v.

The US version of the 500 is rated at  highway by United States Environmental Protection Agency when equipped with the manual transmission; the 500 with the automatic transmission has a fuel mileage of  highway.

The Toluca-built version of the 500 is for sale in the U.S., Canada, and Mexico and was launched in mid-2011 in Brazil and Argentina where it replaces the European version made in Poland.

For 2015 the 500 lines (500, 500c, and 500/500c Abarth) received updates to its interior styling and features. The Easy model is added above the Pop model and below the Sport model. All models also now include the U Connect 5.0BT infotainment system, which features an AM-FM stereo, iPod/USB and 3.5-millimeter auxiliary audio input jacks, U Connect hands-free Bluetooth phone w/ hands-free stereo audio streaming, a five-inch color touch-screen display, and voice command, plus six speakers (six Beats premium amplified speakers on higher-end models), replacing the previous stereo, which included an AM-FM stereo, single-disc CD/MP3 player, 3.5-millimeter auxiliary audio input jack, and six speakers. A rearview backup camera with rear backup sensors is available, as well as a built-in GPS navigational system. SIRIUS-XM Satellite Radio remains an option on lower models and standard on higher-end models. The 500e electric model is not available for 2016.

Trim levels are the Easy (500 ONLY), Pop, Sport, and Abarth. The 1957 Edition is replaced by a Retro Appearance Package, which is now available on all 500 models (aside from the performance-oriented Abarth model).

As of 2018, the 500 Turbo engine, brakes, 16" wheels, suspension tuning, and body kit became standard for all 500 trim levels in the US market (aside from the more powerful 500 Abarth and the electric-drive 500e), and new colors were introduced: Brillante Red, Mezzanotte Blue Pearl, and Vesuvio Black Pearl.

As of September 2019, the Nuova 500 has ended production for the North American market. 2019 is the final model year for the Fiat 500, 500c, 500e, and Abarth in North America, while the 500L and 500X continued to be sold there.

U.S. special editions

Fiat Cinquecento Prima Edizione (2010) 
It is a limited (500 units) version of the Fiat 500 with the 1.4L 16v 100HP engine, for the US market. It include a choice of 3 body colours (Bianco (White), Rosso (Red) and Grigio (Gray)), 5spd manual transmission, exclusive Prima Edizione badge, sequential VIN and badge.

2012 "Pink Ribbon" Edition (2011) 
It is a limited (250 units) version of the 2012 Fiat 500 Lounge model produced in partnership with The Breast Cancer Research Foundation. It includes a choice of Argento (silver) and Bianco (white) body, with a signature dark pink bodyside stripe, Nero leather front and rear seats with pink accent stitching on the perimeter and signature "500" logo embroidered on the front seatbacks and a pink ribbon embroidered on the floor mats and pink accents on Nero leather steering wheel.

Fiat 500 Stinger (2012) 
It is a production version of the 2011 Specialty Equipment Market Association (SEMA) Hottest Sports Compact Car award-winning car but based on the 2012 Fiat 500 Sport with 2-stage options.

Stage 1 includes Giallo (yellow) exterior body, Black Chrome exterior door handles and mirror caps, 17-inch by 7-inch Abarth Hyper Black aluminum wheels with wider 205/40 R 17 performance tires, tinted head and taillamps and license-plate brow, Mopar's vinyl bodyside and roof graphics in the black checker, Mopar's Katzkin leather seats, Alcantara seat centres, Giallo black leather bolsters, and Giallo accent stitching, Mopar carbon-fiber instrument panel decal and Mopar shifter ball finished in Gloss Black.

Stage 2 includes Mopar's cold-air intake and free-flowing cat-back exhaust, performance brakes with cross-drilled rotors.

2014 Fiat 500c GQ Edition (2014–) 
It is a version of the 2014 Fiat 500c produced in association with Condé Nast, with the 1.4-liter MultiAir Turbo (160 hp) engine, five-speed manual transmission, 16-inch split five-spoke aluminum wheels with Hyper Nero (black) with a Rosso (red) center cap and accenting inner backbone, a cloth-top mounted spoiler, a rear-fascia diffuser with dual exhaust, Gloss Nero headlamp, taillamp and parking lamp bezels, a "GQ 500" badge located on the B-pillar, a thick-rim three-spoke steering wheel wrapped in Nero leather with a contrasting Steam (white) inner leather ring, a large concentric instrument cluster with 160-mph speedometer, tachometer and trip computer sits behind the steering wheel with a Nero leather-wrapped cluster brow finished with Tungsten accent stitching; a Nero shift knob with Tungsten accent thread stitching, satin chrome interior accents, Nero leather-wrapped tightly contoured seat bolsters, Alcantara inserts and a Steam leatherette center stripe on the seat cushion, Tungsten accent stitching and a "GQ" embossed in the seatbacks, instrument panel bezel matching body colour with a matte finish, a choice of 4 body colours (Nero Puro (straight black), Argento (silver), Granito Lucente (granite crystal) and Bianco (white)).

The vehicle was unveiled in the 2013 Concorso Italiano auto show, followed by the 2013 Frankfurt Motor Show, and 2014 Toronto Auto Show.

US model was scheduled to arrive to FIAT studios nationwide in early 2014.

2014 Fiat 500 1957 Edition (2014) 

It is a limited version of the 2014 Fiat 500 Lounge for the North American market, commemorating the 57th anniversary of the original 1957 "Nuova" Cinquecento. It included the 1.4l 16v 100HP engine, choice of 3 body colours (Bianco (white), Verde Chiaro (light green) or exclusive Celeste (celestial blue)) with Bianco roof and mirror caps, 16-inch retro wheel design with a wide chromed lip, body-color accent and large center cap with historic "FIAT" emblem; a sport-tuned suspension and all-season performance tires, "FIAT" badges on the front fascia and rear liftgate, Avorio (ivory) interior, Marrone (brown) leather seats, Avorio accent stitching at the seatbacks and seat cushions and perimeter; Grigio (grey) door panels with a unique Avorio inner panel, Marrone door armrests and shift boot (with manual transmission) are color-keyed to the leather seats; exclusive Avorio leather-wrapped steering wheel with Marrone leather on the "inner ring" and features a retro "FIAT" badge; a uniquely styled key fob with Marrone casing and Avorio-painted "1957" graphic, six-speaker and 276-watt FIAT premium audio system with SiriusXM Radio, C514 five-speed manual transmission (optional six-speed automatic transmission with driver-selectable gear changes), driver-selectable "Sport" mode on the instrument panel.

The vehicles arrive at FIAT Studios in the Spring of 2014. Ordering for the US model was set to begin in early 2014.

North American safety
On October 18, 2011, the North American Fiat 500 earned the IIHS (The Insurance Institute for Highway Safety) Top Safety Pick award. In 2011 Fiat sold 19,769 units of the Fiat 500 in the United States. Fiat 500 sales between January and September 2012 is 32,742 units.

The Fiat 500 and Fiat 500L scored a "Poor" rating on the IIHS small overlap crash test.

Concept models

Fiat 500 Coupé Zagato concept (2011)

The vehicle was unveiled at the 2011 Geneva Motor Show.

The Zagato version was confirmed for production but no date has been given.

Zender Abarth 500 Corsa Stradale concept (2013)
The vehicle was unveiled at the 2013 Frankfurt Motor Show.

500e concepts (2022) 
FIAT unvailed 3 concepts of the 2024 fiat 500e at the LA Auto Show They are a preview of the upcoming redesigned second generation Fiat 500e to replace the original 500e that was discontinued in 2019

Electric models
Refer to

Micro Vett 
The Micro Vett electric Fiat 500 has been presented at the London Auto Show by the NICE Car Company.

Fiat 500 EV 
The Italian automaker gave Swedish company EV Adapt permission to buy the stock 500, swap out the combustion motor for an electric one, and then resell the car as an EV. The vehicle is now available throughout Europe. Buyers have the option of purchasing a battery-less car for a reduced price, and then renting its battery pack (in partnership with Alelion Batteries, all vehicles from EV Adapt are equipped with Lithium iron phosphate batteries).

Fiat 500 Elettra (2010)
Chrysler unveiled the Fiat 500 Elettra concept electric car at the 2010 North American International Auto Show. The carmaker announced its decision to build an electric version of the 500 for the U.S. market, with a powertrain to be developed at its Auburn Hills, Michigan headquarters. Initially the electric car was scheduled go into production in 2012.

Production and sales
Within three weeks of the 500's launch, the entire year's production of 58,000 had been sold out. To date, Fiat has received more than 205,000 orders for the 500. While Italy has been the 500's main market (in October 2007, some 9,000 cars had been sold in Italy, making it the 3rd bestselling car there), the 500 has gained a strong following in many countries. Fiat France had received more than 10,000 orders by the end of October 2007. To cope with demand, Fiat has announced that production has been increased to 200,000 in 2008. The 500 was launched on January 21, 2008, in the UK. 500,000 500s have been produced up to March 2010.

By the end of 2013, the Fiat 500 had accumulated over 1 million sales in Europe. In 2013, the 500 outsold the Fiat Panda to become Europe's best-selling minicar for the first time since its launch.

In North America, initial sales were lower than anticipated, as of December 2011, only 16,000 500s were sold in North America, short of the initial goal of 50,000. Poor marketing and a shortage of dealers were blamed for the low numbers, Chrysler Group replaced North American head Laura Soave with Timothy Kuniskis, who was director of marketing for the Chrysler brand. The 1.5 million mark of sold FIAT 500s was reached in 2015.
On March 22, 2021, the 2,500,000th Fiat 500 left the production line in Tychy, in Poland.

Marketing

The launch show, which took place in the Turin's Murazzi del Po region, was a huge firework spectacle that also celebrated the 50th anniversary of the old 500 launch. The show was coordinated by Marco Balich, who was also responsible for Turin's 2006 Winter Olympic Games and was an event never made before for a car launch. Several artists performed during the show, including Lauryn Hill, Israel I dancing group Mayumana, and others. In the first part of the show, artists reproduced scenes of the 60s, such as scenes from films by Federico Fellini, a Beatles show made by a cover band and Marilyn Monroe's iconic "Happy Birthday, Mr. President", which became "Happy Birthday, dear Cinquecento" (sung by a Marilyn cover to celebrate the original 500's fifty years). Several bikes also represented the Giro d'Italia competition, filmed by a cameraman inside an original 500, just like in the 60s. Both the 500 and the bikes floated on the river.

The show was broadcast live by Italian Canale 5 and by a live video stream at fiat500.com, which was watched by over 100,000 people online.

"500 wants you"
A project called "500 wants you" was launched by Fiat as part of a major online advertising campaign. The project uses the Internet to involve the public in planning the evolution of the new vehicle. The official 500 Internet page has been visited by over four million people.

Black bear/Black panther
Print ads titled Black bear and Black panther were produced Leo Burnett agency for French market. The ads were premiered in September 2010.

Fiat 500 Cinema Challenge
As part of the Fiat 500C launch in Germany, an interactive game event was held inside a movie theatre. Theatre attendants would find steering hands with a coupon that allows the attendant to win a weekend driving a Fiat 500C. Attendants played the interactive game by trying to collectively drive two on-screen Fiat 500C cars around a uniquely designed race track.

The campaign was produced Leo Burnett agency.

Fiat 500 hand dryer
To demonstrate Fiat's Start & Stop system, Leo Burnett, Frankfurt developed the Fiat 500 hand dryer to promote its eco-friendly image.

500 by Gucci
As part of the 500 by Gucci product launch, a commercial featuring model Natasha Poly was produced. The commercial was shot by Mert Alas and Marcus Piggott in Rome, and conceived by Giannini. In addition, single and double-page print ads were also produced.

500 by Gucci short film collection
It is a series of 5 films starring the 500 by Gucci.

Papillon Polaroid (produced by Olivier Zahm (Editor in Chief of Purple Fashion magazine)) featuring Betony Vernon, is set at the Museo Casa Mollino, Torino, the former home and now a museum dedicated to Italian designer and architect, Carlo Mollino. This film would create a poetic combination of three pillars of Italian design: Fiat, Gucci, and Carlo Mollino.

The Race (produced by photographer and director Will Davidson) features Fiat 500 by Gucci.

Assembly line (produced by Chris Sweeney (Film Director for NOWNESS)) fuses two powerhouses of Italian design with a playful twist that brings the 500 to life in a completely unexpected way.

Reverse to Perfection (produced by Francesco Carrozzini) features luxury restores order with the Fiat 500 by Gucci.

Divergence (produced by Alexi Tan (Film Director)) features two lovers who are having a secret affair. They long to be together and at the same time, they know they shouldn't be. Just like their passionate encounters, their one of a kind cars, two Fiat 500 By Gucci also reflect the state of their relationship, moving fast apart but always finding a way to come back. She decides to leave once and for all, he makes the chase... will they return to one another one more time?

The films were premiered at the Independent Ideas headquarters in Milan, during a special event for a select audience of international journalists and opinion leaders, in the presence of Lapo Elkann.

North American launch campaign
A tagline 'Simply More' was used to define 'The Fiat 500 as everything you need and nothing you don't. It represents the notion that the simple things in life are treasures, alongside the thought that the richness and fullness of a life well-lived is defined by one's view of self-expression.'

In the 'Life Is Best When Driven' campaign, Jennifer Lopez was featured in the "My World" ad. The Smoking Gun reported the Big Block-produced commercial was shot in Los Angeles, and a body-double was used for the scenes showing the car driving through Lopez' 'hometown of the Bronx'. Following the production of the ad, the artists behind a copyrighted mural in the Bronx sued Chrysler for using the image in the commercial without their permission, which was later settled out of court in undisclosed terms. Jennifer Lopez later appeared in 2011 American Music Awards with a 2012 Fiat 500 during her performance of "Papi", a 30 and 60-second versions of Fiat 500 Pop commercial, and the Fiat 500C Gucci Edition ad titled 'Elegance'.

In the 500 Abarth 'Seduction' ad, Jennifer Lopez was replaced by Romanian model Catrinel Menghia. A Pop-Up Video version of the ad was also produced.

Another Fiat 500 TV commercial titled 'Liberation' debuted at the 2012 Golden Globes Award Show.

A new Fiat 500 Abarth TV commercial starring Charlie Sheen and Catrinel Menghia debuted during the 2012 NCAA Tournament.

Abarth 595 '50th Anniversary'
As part of Abarth 595 '50th Anniversary' launch, a series of commercial activities across the Abarth range and by an extremely digital communication plan which revolves around the new commercial: the essence of the Abarth brand concentrated in 5.95 seconds through an evocative and epic slow motion. The communication also goes through the channels more customary for the brand with the organization of the first digital "rally" (where at least virtual 595 Abarth cars will be involved) and the most numerous anniversary ever, also celebrated with a fun app for iPhone, iPad, Android, and Facebook through which Abarth fans can "play" their favourite tunes substituting the musical notes with the powerful sounds of the engines of the Abarth cars. There will also be events celebrating the anniversary.

2014 Fiat 500c GQ Edition
As part of the 2014 Fiat 500c GQ Edition launch, the FIAT brand sponsored the 'How GQ Are You?' online photo-sharing platform, where participants can upload photos of themselves to compete in online style contests, with winning participants awarded monthly prizes, culminating in December with the give-away of one Fiat 500c GQ Edition to the 'Most GQ Guy of the Year,' chosen by the public and the editors of GQ Magazine.

Sales

Awards
In 2011 the TwinAir engine used in the 500 was awarded with four awards in the International Engine of the Year competition.

What Car? readers' affections 2007
Car: Car of the Year 2007
EuroCarBody 2007 award
European Car of the Year for 2008
The World's Most Beautiful Automobile (City Car and Small Car category)
AUTO EUROPA 2008
Fifth Gear: Best Small Car 2007
Top Gear: Best 'City Car' 2007
Auto 1 Europa 2008 – (Auto Bild) 
2008 'What Car?' Green Car of the Year Award
Auto Express: "Best City Car" 2008 
evecars.com Best Supermini/City Car Award 2008
evecars.com readers Sexiest Manbag type Car of 2008
Best Compact Car Consumers' Choice Award-Car of the Year in Japan
2009 World Car Design of the Year
Auto Express: "Best City Car" 2009 
2010 "What Car? Green Car of the year supermini category
First place in the 2011 J.D. Power & Associates "Vehicle Owner Satisfaction Study" (conducted in Germany).
Best City Car in the 2011 Fleet World Honours.
Men's Journal: "Gear of the Year" award, 2011 Vehicle category (U.S. version).

In 2009, an art installation designed by architect Fabio Novembre featured 20 full-size fibreglass replicas of the Fiat 500C, shaped as planters, along Milan's famous Via Monte Napoleone.

See also
 Fiat 500
 Fiat 500L
 Fiat 500X

Notes

References

Further reading
 Fiat 500 – by the people for the people, di Alessandro Sannia, ed. All Media, 2007, 
 Fiat 500 – l'evoluzione del mito, di Alessandro Sannia, ed. Gribaudo, 2007,

External links

 

2010s cars
Cars introduced in 2007
City cars
Convertibles
Euro NCAP superminis
500 (2007)
Front-wheel-drive vehicles
Hot hatches
Retro-style automobiles
Production electric cars
Fiat electric vehicles